Oliver James Hairs (born 14 April 1991) is a Scottish cricketer. He made his One Day International (ODI) debut against the Netherlands in 2010. In June 2019, he was selected to represent Scotland A in their tour to Ireland to play the Ireland Wolves. He made his Twenty20 debut for Scotland A against the Ireland Wolves on 9 June 2019.

In July 2019, he was selected to play for the Edinburgh Rocks in the inaugural edition of the Euro T20 Slam cricket tournament. However, the following month the tournament was cancelled.

In September 2019, he was named in Scotland's squad for the 2019–20 Ireland Tri-Nation Series and the 2019 ICC T20 World Cup Qualifier tournament in the United Arab Emirates. He made his T20I debut for Scotland, against the Netherlands, on 16 September 2019. In September 2021, Hairs was named in Scotland's provisional squad for the 2021 ICC Men's T20 World Cup.

References

1991 births
Living people
Scottish cricketers
Scotland One Day International cricketers
Scotland Twenty20 International cricketers
People from Redhill, Surrey